René or Renato Herbert Paresce (5 January 1886 – 15 October 1937) was a Swiss-born Italian painter and writer.

Biography
René was born in Carouge, a suburb of Geneva. His father was a militant socialist from Palermo and his mother, Lidia Ignatieff, was the daughter of a Russian businessman. As a young man, he traveled to Paris. His parents travelled frequently, including to Moscow and Florence.

After having been refused an academic position at Palermo, he became a teacher of natural sciences at the Barnabite affiliated Collegio alla Quercia in Florence. He continued to spend time painting and befriended the painter Baccio Maria Bacci. He also  worked as a translator of French and Russian. In 1912, he married the pianist Ella Klatschko (1880–1966), daughter of the Russian-Jewish revolutionary, .

In 1912, they moved to Paris. There he met or befriended Cezanne, Odilon Redon, Picasso, Diaghilev, Élie Faure, Paul Fort, Max Jacob, André Salmon, Diego Rivera, and Modigliani, who dedicated a painting to him in 1917.

During World War I, he moved to London, where he participated in marine research with the National Physical Laboratory. While there, he met Oskar Kokoschka. After the war, he traveled as a journalist to cover the Versailles conference, working for Il Giornale d'Italia and, later, La Stampa; signing his articles Renato. He soon was writing pieces about art criticism and painting to support his family. He remained in Paris until 1930.

In 1926, Margherita Sarfatti invited René to exhibit in Milan with the painters of the Novecento Italiano. He continued to exhibit in Venice, Zürich, and Paris.

In 1933, René had a personal exhibition hosted at the Galleria del Milione in Milan. In 1934, he took a voyage around the world, with a stop at Fiji, then crossed the United States; a trip he chronicled in a series of articles for La Stampa. In 1935, they were collected in a book titled L’altra America. After a long period when his interest in painting gradually declined, he died in Paris.

References

External links

1886 births
1937 deaths
20th-century Italian painters
Italian male painters
Artists from Florence
20th-century Italian writers
20th-century Italian male writers
People from Carouge
20th-century Italian male artists
Swiss emigrants to Italy